Jean Maria Arrigo is an American social psychologist and oral historian.

Career 
Arrigo was a member of a 2005 American Psychological Association (APA) task force evaluating the role of psychologists in U.S. intelligence and military interrogations of detainees. 
She became known for exposing conflicts of interest of most of the others on the nominally independent task force, who were allied in advance with advocates of harsh interrogation methods.

For her whistleblowing actions, the APA honored Arrigo in 2015 and the American Association for the Advancement of Science presented their 2015 AAAS Award for Scientific Freedom and Responsibility to her.

Published works 
 
 Sins and Salvations in Clandestine Scientific Research: A Social Psychological and Epistemological Inquiry, Claremont Graduate University, 1999

References

External links
 APA Interrogation Task Force Member Dr. Jean Maria Arrigo Exposes Group's Ties to Military, Democracy Now, August 20, 2007

American women psychologists
American social psychologists
American whistleblowers
American Psychological Association
Oral historians
Year of birth missing (living people)
Living people
21st-century American women
American psychologists